The Encounter, published in 1996 and written by K. A. Applegate, is the third book in the Animorphs series. It is narrated by Tobias.

Plot summary

Tobias and Rachel liberate a caged red-tailed hawk from a car dealership, Dealin' Dan Hawke's Used Cars, where it is being used as a mascot in advertisements. Later that evening, Tobias sees a shimmer in the air and is perplexed by it.  He decides to check it out again the next day, and this time notices a flock of geese seemingly run into an invisible wall in the air. Tobias suspects the anomaly to be a Yeerk ship using optical camouflage and tells the other Animorphs about it. The group morphs into wolves to follow the last known direction of the ship into the mountains. They arrive at a lake guarded by Park Service human-controllers and Hork-Bajir-controllers. The ship decloaks over the lake, revealing itself to be a massive logistics ship that collects water and air for the Yeerk Pool ship in orbit. Tobias also sees the hawk that he and Rachel freed, and has an urge to be with her.

The Animorphs return from the mountains and make plans to morph into fish in the lake and get sucked up by the ship so they can disable it from the inside, thus deactivating the cloaking device while it is above a city and revealing the Yeerk invasion to the general public. Tobias heads up to the lake again to scope out potential hiding places, but his hawk instincts overpower him on the way and he kills and eats a rat. Greatly disturbed by the experience, he flies to Rachel's gymnastics exhibition at the mall and tries to commit suicide. He flies around the mall in a panicked state until Marco smashes open a skylight for him with a baseball to escape. Tobias regresses into his hawk instincts for several days, living in the woods and hunting rodents. His human side only re-emerges when he saves a man escaping from Hork-Bajir near the mountain lake. He returns to Rachel to talk about what happened, and he decides that he needs to keep fighting the Yeerks to remain human.

The Animorphs revisit the lake and hide in a cave until the Yeerks arrive. They then morph trout, and Tobias carries them to the lake to avoid notice by the Yeerks who have locked down the area. The others are successfully sucked up into the ship, but they discover that the water tank is sealed off inside; they are trapped. They communicate this information to Tobias and ask him to bring the ship down if possible. Meanwhile, Tobias is spotted and identified as an "Andalite bandit." To avoid attacks from Yeerk Bug Fighters and helicopters, he lands on top of the logistics ship, the one place he can be sure the Yeerks won't risk firing. A dozen Taxxons emerge out onto the deck to kill him, but Tobias aims for the eyes of the nearest one. The Taxxon, trying to shield itself, accidentally makes it easier for Tobias to grab its Dracon beam. He grabs the weapon, flies to the ship's Bridge, and fires the beam into the bridge, making the ship fly out of control and crash into the other Yeerk ships (Bug Fighters and USFS helicopters). A large gash is torn in the side of the ship, and the other Animorphs come pouring out with the collected water.  They are able to morph into birds and escape. Tobias again sees the female hawk, but the Yeerks, mistaking her for him, kill her.

The remains of the downed truck ship are disposed of by the Yeerks, thus leaving no evidence for the Animorphs to show the world. Tobias is distressed over the death of the hawk, but realizes that it is this emotion that makes him human, as a true hawk would not care if another hawk had died. Tobias discusses this with Rachel, and begins to accept his newfound balance between being a hawk and being a human.

Inconsistencies
Tobias states that Marco had previously acquired a bald eagle morph and used it during the escape from the Yeerk ship. However, Marco never acquired a bald eagle; his raptor morph is an osprey.
Tobias is shown morphing into a hawk on the cover page as a brunette, but he was described previously as having blonde hair.
Tobias states that the truck ship is about 700 feet above the forest when the rest of the Animorphs fall out of the ship. It takes less than 7 seconds to fall that distance. Despite that, everyone is able to completely morph into birds before hitting the ground (all of them except Marco manage to even stay above the treeline), even though the morphing process is described as taking up to 2 minutes.

Morphs

   
This is the first book where the cover morph does not depict a morph acquired or used in the book, though technically, Tobias is always "using" his hawk morph.

Re-release
In July 2011, Scholastic released The Encounter with a new lenticular cover that changes as the person holding it turns the book back and forth.

References

External links
Official page at Scholastic.com

Animorphs books
1996 novels
1996 science fiction novels
Books with cover art by David Burroughs Mattingly
Books about birds